Markus Heitz (born 10 October 1971) is a German fantasy, horror and science fiction author best known for his Dwarves series of novels.

Biography 
Markus Heitz was born in Homburg, Germany, in 1971. He studied history, literature, and the German language. He now lives in Zweibrücken, Germany.

Bibliography

Translated into English

The Dwarves (Die Zwerge)

The Legends of the Älfar (Die Legenden der Albae)

Doors

Other Works

Unavailable in English

Ulldart: Die Dunkle Zeit

Ulldart: Die Zeit des Neuen

Die Mächte des Feuers

Dunkle Spannung: Die Bestie

Dunkle Spannung: Kinder des Judas

Dunkle Spannung: Blutportale

Spannung: Totenblick

Spannung: Exkarnation

Justifiers

Shadowrun

References

External links

 Author's website
 website about the author's vampire series
 
  Review of Righteous Fury by Markus Heitz

1971 births
German fantasy writers
German male writers
German science fiction writers
Living people
People from Homburg, Saarland